Tagan may refer to the following places:

Tagan, Iran, a village in Dargaz County, Razavi Khorasan province, Iran
Taqan, a village in Firuzeh County, Razavi Khorasan province, Iran
Taghan, a village in South Khorasan province, Iran

See also